The Arbors were an American pop group formed in 1964 in Ann Arbor, Michigan. The members, two sets of brothers, met at the University of Michigan-Ann Arbor, and began playing local shows in Michigan before moving to New York City. They recorded a single for Mercury Records which garnered little attention, but their next single, "A Symphony for Susan" (recorded for Carney Records), was reissued nationally on Columbia Records subsidiary, Date Records and hit #51 on the US chart; they followed with the singles "Just Let it Happen" and Graduation Day  (US #59).

In 1968, they recorded the song "Valley of the Dolls", written for (but not actually used in) the movie of the same name. Despite an endorsement from the original book's author Jacqueline Susann, the Arbors' tune was overshadowed by Dory Previn's title song from the movie and was not a national hit (it did manage to make the top ten at WAAM radio back in Ann Arbor). They bounced back with a 1969 version of "The Letter", which had been a hit two years before for The Box Tops. The cover became their biggest hit, reaching #20 on the US singles chart, and they followed it with the release of an album that included their interpretations of Bob Dylan's "Like a Rolling Stone", The Doors' "Touch Me", Blood, Sweat & Tears' "I Can't Quit Her" (US #67), and Simon & Garfunkel's "For Emily, Whenever I May Find Her". It was the group's last recording for Columbia, and afterward, they began writing and playing music for commercials, and continued to do so for some thirty years thereafter.

Personnel
Vocalists
Tom Herrick
Scott Herrick (born Paul Scott Herrick, 1937 – November 7, 2018; died at his home in Ajijic, Jalisco, Mexico, after suffering a stroke)
Edward "Ed" Farran (June 17, 1937 – January 2, 2003; died of kidney failure, at the age of 65)
Frederick "Fred" Farran (June 17, 1937 – August 29, 2011; died after a bout of pneumonia, at the age of 74)

The Farran brothers were identical twins.

Manager
 Art Ward

Discography

Albums
A Symphony for Susan (Date Records, 1967) US #144
The Arbors (Date Records, 1968)
Featuring: I Can't Quit Her - The Letter (Columbia Records, 1969)
Track listing

The Arbors (Arbors Music/No Label, 1977)
So Fine  (Arbors Music/No Label, 1978)

See also
List of sibling groups

References

External links
[ The Arbors] at Allmusic.com

Musical groups from Michigan
American pop music groups
University of Michigan alumni
Musical groups established in 1964
1964 establishments in Michigan
Musicians from Ann Arbor, Michigan